Råne River (Swedish: Råneälven) is a river in Sweden.

References

Drainage basins of the Baltic Sea
Rivers of Norrbotten County